Jorge Pedro Marchetta (13 April 1942 – 7 April 2022) was an Argentine professional football player and manager. Marchetta is widely regarded as one of the most charismatic managers in the history of Argentine football.

Despite his long career as manager, Marchetta won only one title in his career, the 1985 Primera B championship coaching Rosario Central that allowed the club to return to Primera División.

Playing career 
Born in Lomas de Zamora, Marchetta began his football career with Racing, making his debut for them in 1962, and later playing for Gimnasia y Esgrima La Plata, Los Andes, Santiago Morning, Deportivo Quito and Ever Ready of Dolores. He retired from playing at the age of 30 and, having trained as a bookkeeper, began managing a hotel.

Coaching career 
Marchetta began his coaching career as an assistant coach at Racing, before becoming manager of Los Andes in 1983. He later managed Racing de Córdoba, Rosario Central, Vélez Sarsfield, Talleres de Córdoba, Belgrano, Racing de Córdoba again, Independiente, Rosario Central again, Racing, Belgrano again, Los Andes again, Independiente Rivadavia, Racing de Córdoba again, Deportivo Quito, Belgrano again, Barcelona (ECU), and General Paz Juniors.

Personal life
In 2006, Marchetta suffered a stroke, which forced him to put his career in a hiatus. He died in the Cordobese city of Villa Carlos Paz on April 7, 2022. He was 79 years old and still had sequels from the stroke.

Titles
As manager:
Rosario Central
 Primera B (1): 1985

References

1942 births
2022 deaths
People from Lomas de Zamora
Argentine footballers
Association football midfielders
Racing Club de Avellaneda footballers
Club de Gimnasia y Esgrima La Plata footballers
Club Atlético Los Andes footballers
Santiago Morning footballers
S.D. Quito footballers
Association football coaches
Racing Club de Avellaneda non-playing staff
Argentine football managers
Club Atlético Los Andes managers
Racing de Córdoba managers
Rosario Central managers
Club Atlético Vélez Sarsfield managers
Talleres de Córdoba managers
Club Atlético Belgrano managers
Club Atlético Independiente managers
Racing Club de Avellaneda managers
Independiente Rivadavia managers
S.D. Quito managers
Barcelona S.C. managers
General Paz Juniors managers
Argentine expatriate footballers
Argentine expatriate football managers
Argentine expatriate sportspeople in Ecuador
Expatriate footballers in Ecuador
Expatriate football managers in Ecuador
Argentine expatriate sportspeople in Chile
Expatriate footballers in Chile
Sportspeople from Buenos Aires Province